Easy as Pie is an album by vibraphonist Gary Burton recorded in 1980 and released on the ECM label in 1981. It features a new quartet with alto saxophonist James Odgren, bassist Steve Swallow and drummer Michael Hyman.

Reception 
The Allmusic review by Scott Yanow awarded the album 3 stars, stating: "The repertoire is stronger and less introverted than usual.... Swinging sections alternate with more thoughtful pieces, resulting in a particularly well-rounded set".

Track listing 
All compositions by Chick Corea except as indicated
 "Reactionary Tango" (Carla Bley) - 11:40   
 "Tweek" -  5:34   
 "Blame It On My Youth" (Oscar Levant, Edward Heyman) - 5:43   
 "Summer Band Camp" (Mick Goodrick) - 7:47   
 "Isfahan" (Billy Strayhorn, Duke Ellington)  - 8:05   
 "Stardancer" - 8:55   
Recorded at Tonstudio Bauer in Ludwigsburg, West Germany, in June 1980

Personnel 
 Gary Burto] — vibraphone
 Jim Odgren — alto saxophone
 Steve Swallow — electric bass
 Mike Hyman — drums

References 

ECM Records albums
Gary Burton albums
Albums produced by Manfred Eicher
1981 albums